Werner Hofmann may refer to:

Werner Hofmann (art historian) (1928–2013), Austrian art historian
Werner Hofmann (physicist) (born 1952), German physicist
Werner Hofmann (footballer), German football player